Princess Anne of Orléans (Anne Hélène Marie; 5 August 1906, Le Nouvion-en-Thiérache, Aisne – 19 March 1986, Sorrento) was a member of the House of Orléans and the Duchess of Aosta by marriage. 
She was the daughter of Prince Jean, Duke of Guise, and Princess Isabelle of Orléans.

Marriage and issue
She married at Naples, Italy, on 5 November 1927, her first cousin Prince Amedeo of Savoy, Duke of Aosta (1898–1942).  The couple had two daughters:

 Princess Margherita of Savoy-Aosta (born 7 April 1930 at Capodimonte Palace - 10 January 2022 at Basel); married on 28–29 December 1953 Archduke Robert, Archduke of Austria-Este (1915–1996), second son of the last Austrian emperor, Charles I. They have three sons and two daughters.
 Princess Maria Cristina of Savoy-Aosta (born 12 September 1933 at Miramare Castle); married on 29 January 1967 Prince Casimir of Bourbon-Two Sicilies, son of Prince Gabriel of Bourbon-Two Sicilies and his second wife, Princess Cecylia Lubomirska. They have two sons and two daughters.

Ancestry

References

1906 births
1986 deaths
People from Aisne
French Roman Catholics
Princesses of France (Orléans)
Duchesses of Aosta
Princesses of Savoy
Italian princesses
Princesses della Cisterna